was a Japanese politician of the People's New Party, a member of the House of Councillors in the Diet (national legislature). A native of Shōbara, Hiroshima and graduate of the University of Tokyo, he was elected to the House of Councillors for the first time in 1998 after serving in the assembly of Hiroshima Prefecture. Shizuka Kamei, a member of the House of Representatives, is his brother.

References

External links
 

1933 births
2019 deaths
Members of the House of Councillors (Japan)
People's New Party politicians
21st-century Japanese politicians
Liberal Democratic Party (Japan) politicians
University of Tokyo alumni